Clint is a village in Nidderdale in North Yorkshire, England.  It lies on the north bank of the River Nidd, 4 miles north-west of Harrogate.  Clint is the largest village in the civil parish of Clint cum Hamlets, which also includes the settlements of Burnt Yates and Bedlam.

The toponym represents the Old Danish klint, meaning "steep or rocky bank".

References 

Villages in North Yorkshire
Nidderdale